Ekla Cholo is a  2015 Bengali television movie directed by Abhijit Guha and Sudeshna Roy. The movie features Saayoni Ghosh and June Malia in the main roles. The film was jointly produced by Zee Bangla Cinema and Prosenjit Chatterjee. In 2014, Zeke Bangle Cinema and Proserpine Chatterjee agreed to jointly produce movies to be shown directly on TV. Ekla Cholo was the first attempt by the partnership, and the film enjoyed widespread popularity and received 21a score of in Target Rating Point.

Plot
Ekla Cholo is a romantic comedy about a woman who wants to become a single mother. Betrayed and disappointed by her last boyfriend and inspired by her mother, she wishes to raise a child without a man in her life. She is faced with many challenges. That is when Riya meets Rupam.

Cast
 Saayoni Ghosh as Riya
 June Malia as Riya's Mom
 Koushik Roy as Rupam
 Anindya Chatterjee as Riya's ex-boyfriend

Sequel
A sequel named Abar Ekla Cholo has been released in 2016.

References

External links 

 

Indian television films
2015 television films
2015 films
2010s Bengali-language films
Films directed by Abhijit Guha and Sudeshna Roy